Kacie McDonnell (Born July 30, 1990) is a Fox News Talent mostly on Fox Business as host of Mansion Global. Her first assignment was hosting the red carpet in the Patriot Awards in 2019.

Early life and education
She was born and raised in Pottsville, Pennsylvania. She went to Nativity BVM High School then Villanova University where she graduated in 2012 with a bachelor's degree in communications.

Career
Prior to joining Fox News, McDonnell began her career in sports at WTXF-TV, delivering reports on the Philadelphia Eagles for Good Day Philadelphia. She also was the traffic reporter there. McDonnell then spent two years at KSHB-TV in Kansas City, Missouri where she also worked as a sideline reporter for Sporting Kansas City. McDonnell served as an anchor for the New England Sports Network covering professional sports across Boston. She covered the Final Four when her alma mater Villanova University played and later winning the titles in 2016 and 2018 for Turner Sports.

Personal life
McDonnell began dating NFL quarterback Aaron Murray in 2013.  They became engaged in 2014, before calling it off the following year.

She married Major League Baseball player Eric Hosmer on December 31, 2021. She has taken her husband's name in her social media pages. The couple announced in April 2022 that they were expecting their first child later that year.

References

External links

1990 births
Fox News people
Living people
People from Pottsville, Pennsylvania
Villanova University alumni